John Russell (September 20, 1822 – November 3, 1912) was a Methodist preacher who became a leading advocate for prohibition during the 1870s. Russell helped organize the Prohibition Party, was its first National Committee Chairman, and was the party's running mate for James Black in the 1872 United States presidential election. As a journalist, Russell published the Detroit Peninsular Herald as the first prohibition newspaper.

Life

John Russell was born on September 20, 1822, to Jesse Russell and Catherine Russell in Livingston County, New York. In 1869, he made calls for a convention to form a party in favor of alcoholic prohibition and in Chicago, Illinois he was selected as its first national committee chairman. He died on November 4, 1912 in Detroit, Michigan.

References

External links

1822 births
1912 deaths
Activists from New York (state)
American Methodist clergy
Journalists from Michigan
Michigan Prohibitionists
New York (state) Prohibitionists
People from Livingston, New York
Politicians from Detroit
Prohibition Party (United States) vice presidential nominees
19th-century Methodists
19th-century American newspaper publishers (people)